Damien Shaw (born 10 July 1984) is an Irish former professional cyclist, who rode professionally for  in 2016 and 2017, and  in 2018. As well as competing individually on the roads, Shaw was a tandem pilot at the 2011 UCI Para-cycling Track World Championships and the 2012 Summer Paralympics, winning a bronze medal at the latter – in the road time trial B – with James Brown.

Major results

2011
 2nd Criterium, National Road Championships
2012
 2nd Criterium, National Road Championships
2013
 3rd Road race, National Road Championships
2014
 2nd Criterium, National Road Championships
2015
 1st  Road race, National Road Championships
 1st  County rider classification Rás Tailteann
2016
 5th Overall Rás Tailteann
2017
 5th Overall Rás Tailteann
 6th Overall Tour du Loir-et-Cher
1st Stage 1
2018
 2nd Criterium, National Road Championships
 4th Overall Rás Tailteann

References

External links

1984 births
Living people
Irish male cyclists
People from Mullingar